Mordechai "Motaleh" Shpigler  (born 19 August 1944) is a retired Israeli footballer, and manager. Shpigler is placed second in Israel's all time goalscoring list, with 32 goals in 83 caps.

Early life
Mordechai Shpigler was born in Asbest, Soviet Russia, and is Jewish. He immigrated to Netanya, Israel, when he was a boy.

Playing career

Club career
As a striker, he played for Maccabi Netanya along with Paris Saint Germain in France and alongside Pelé for New York Cosmos of the North American Soccer League in the 1970s.

He was chosen as the Israeli Player of the Year a record four times, in 1967–68, 1968–69, 1969–70, and in 1970–71.

International career

Shpigler made his international debut for Israel on 2 January 1964 against Hong Kong. He took part in the Israeli win in the 1964 AFC Asian Cup, and scored 2 goals at the tournament, which made him a joint top scorer of the tournament.

His major achievement was helping Israel qualify for the 1970 FIFA World Cup in Mexico. He scored Israel's lone goal in World Cup history in a 1–1 draw against Sweden.

His 32 goals for the national team (according to IFA count, FIFA counts only 24 of them) was the Israeli record up until 2021 when he was surpassed by Eran Zahavi. Shpigler scored 24 goals in 62 'official' internationals for the Israeli national side, he also played in 21 other 'unofficial' matches (mostly Olympic Games qualifiers) scoring eight more goals.

Shpigler captained the Israeli Olympic team at Mexico City 1968 which reached the quarter-finals, losing to Bulgaria by a draw after the match ended 1–1.

Post-playing career
Spiegler was nominated as the best Israeli player of the prior 50 years by the Israel Football Association in the UEFA Jubilee Awards in November 2003. Shpigler is a member of the Education and Publicity Committee of the IFA.

In 2007, he won a lifetime contributions special award for the Israeli national team in the 1970 FIFA World Cup, determined by Yedioth Ahronoth and the Israeli football player association.

Career statistics

Club

International

International goals
Scores and results list Israel's goal tally first, score column indicates score after each Spiegler goal.

Managerial statistics

Honours

Player
Maccabi Netanya
Israeli Premier League: 1970–71, 1977–78
Israel State Cup: 1977–78
Israeli Supercup: 1971, 1978

Israel
AFC Youth Championship: 1964
AFC Asian Cup: 1964

Individual
Israeli Premier League top goalscorer: 1965–66, 1966–68, 1968–69
Israeli Player of the Year: 1965–66, 1968–69, 1969–70, 1970–71
Member of the Israeli Football Hall of Fame

Manager
Beitar Tel Aviv
Second Division:1980–81

Maccabi Netanya
Israeli Premier League: 1982–83
Israeli Supercup: 1983
UEFA Intertoto Cup: 1983, 1984
League Cup: 1982, 1983

See also
List of Ligue 1 hat-tricks
List of Jews in sports

References

External links 
 

1944 births
Soviet Jews
Israeli Jews
UEFA Golden Players
People from Asbest
Soviet emigrants to Israel
Living people
Association football forwards
Israeli footballers
Maccabi Netanya F.C. players
Beitar Tel Aviv F.C. players
Paris FC players
Paris Saint-Germain F.C. players
Israel international footballers
Israeli expatriate footballers
Olympic footballers of Israel
1964 AFC Asian Cup players
1968 AFC Asian Cup players
Footballers at the 1968 Summer Olympics
1970 FIFA World Cup players
AFC Asian Cup-winning players
Ligue 1 players
Expatriate footballers in France
Expatriate soccer players in South Africa
North American Soccer League (1968–1984) players
Expatriate soccer players in the United States
New York Cosmos players
Maccabi Haifa F.C. managers
Israeli football managers
Hapoel Haifa F.C. managers
Maccabi Netanya F.C. managers
Jewish Guild players
Israeli expatriate sportspeople in France
Israeli expatriate sportspeople in South Africa
Israeli expatriate sportspeople in the United States
Footballers from Netanya
Israeli Footballer of the Year recipients